Thank You for Arguing: What Aristotle, Lincoln, and Homer Simpson Can Teach Us About the Art of Persuasion  is a New York Times bestselling non-fiction book by Jay Heinrichs. It is on its 4th edition. The book covers the history of rhetoric, and uses modern examples of how persuasion is used in politics, advertising, media - and how you can teach a kid to argue.

References 

2007 non-fiction books
Rhetoric
Books about persuasion
Three Rivers Press books